Liubeshiv is an urban-type settlement in Kamin-Kashyrskyi Raion of Volyn Oblast, in the historic region of the Polesia. It is an administrative seat of Liubeshiv settlement hromada. Population:

History 

Lubieszów was first mentioned in 1484. It was a private town of Grand Duchy of Lithuania, later part of Polish–Lithuanian Commonwealth. After the Partitions of Poland it was annexed by Russia.

On 9 November 1943, 300 Poles were murdered by the Ukrainians as part of the genocide of Poles in Volhynia. A 2013 monument on the local Polish cemetery commemorates the victims

Notable people 
 Taras Mykhalyk, retired Ukrainian footballer.

References

External links
 Liubeshiv at the Ukrainian Soviet Encyclopedia

Urban-type settlements in Kamin-Kashyrskyi Raion
Pinsky Uyezd
Polesie Voivodeship